Olympia Province was one of the provinces of the Elis Prefecture, Greece. Its territory corresponded with that of the current municipalities Andritsaina-Krestena and Zacharo, and the municipal unit Volakas. It was abolished in 1997.

References

Provinces of Greece
Elis